The cervical spinal nerve 2 (C2) is a spinal nerve of the cervical segment. It is a part of the ansa cervicalis along with the C1 and C3 nerves sometimes forming part of Superior root of the ansa cervicalis. it also connects into the inferior root of the ansa cervicalis with the C3. 

It originates from the spinal column from above the cervical vertebra 2 (C2).

it innervates the rectus capitis anterior and rectus capitis lateralis muscles, and provides sensory nerves to the trapezius. 

the lesser occipital nerve, greater auricular nerve, and the transverse cervical nerve all emerge from C2, with the latter two shared with the C3.

References

Spinal nerves